Thierry Makon Nloga (born 9 October 1993) is a Cameroonian football player.

He played with Caïman Douala, New Star de Douala and Esperance Sportive de Tunis.  He made a debut for the Cameroon national football team in an unofficial game in 2012, then in 2013 he made an appearance in an official match played on February 6 against Tanzania.

In August 2013, he joined Croatian side HNK Hajduk Split on trials.

References

1993 births
Living people
Cameroonian footballers
Cameroon international footballers
Association football midfielders
Espérance Sportive de Tunis players
Expatriate footballers in Tunisia
New Star de Douala players